Theretra inornata is a moth of the  family Sphingidae. It is known from Queensland.

The upperside is uniformly olive-green or brown with a minimum of forewing pattern. The antenna have pinkish white dorsal scaling, with a black apical patch. The forewing upperside is uniform olive-green or brown with only a small discal spot and a single strong oblique postmedian line that does not reach the wing apex.

References

Theretra
Moths described in 1865